Mihály Luttár was a  Slovene petty nobleman in the 17th century. He was born in the Slovene Circumscription (Slovenska okroglina, today Prekmurje), but lived in the Croatian town of Međimurje,  Kutnjak, near Legrad. In 1650 or 1651, he let out the blotters  of István Bánffy and wrote notes about the Luttár family.

See also 
 List of Slovene writers and poets in Hungary

Sources
 Szinnyei József: Magyar írók élete és munkái VIII. (Löbl–Minnich). Budapest: Hornyánszky. 1902. → Luttár Mihály

Slovenian writers and poets in Hungary